Carleton North High School is a high school located in Florenceville-Bristol, New Brunswick. Carleton North High School is in the Anglophone West School District and one of the last schools in New Brunswick that participated in the New Brunswick Potato Picking Week.

See also
 List of schools in New Brunswick
 Anglophone West School District

References

Schools in Carleton County, New Brunswick
High schools in New Brunswick